The Roman Catholic Diocese of Zamora is a diocese in the city of Zamora in the ecclesiastical province of Valladolid in Spain.

History
 1000: Established as Diocese of Zamora
 1102–20: Administered by Jerome of Périgord, Bishop of Salamanca
 1122: Re-established under Bishop Bernard de Périgord

Bishops
Bishops of Zamora

Bishops to 1600

1600s

1700s

1800s

1900s

2000s

See also
Roman Catholicism in Spain
Roman Catholic Diocese of León in Spain
Kingdom of León
Leonese language

Sources

 GCatholic.org
 Catholic Hierarchy
 Diocese website

Roman Catholic dioceses in Spain
Dioceses established in the 10th century